was a Japanese literati painter (nanga in Japanese).  He originally trained as a Confucian scholar, but spent the second half of his life as a literati and artist.  The book Mountains of the Heart contains many of his most famous paintings.

References
 Addiss, Stephen, Kameda Bôsai’s Mountains of the Heart, Daruma Magazine, No. 60, 48-52, 2008.
 Addiss, Stephen, The world of Kameda Bôsai, the calligraphy, poetry, painting, and artistic circle of a Japanese literatus, New Orleans, New Orleans Museum of Art, 1984.
 Bôsai, Kameda Mountains of the Heart, New York, G. Braziller, 2007.

External links
Bridge of dreams: the Mary Griggs Burke collection of Japanese art, a catalog from The Metropolitan Museum of Art Libraries (fully available online as PDF), which contains material on Kameda Bōsai (see index)

Japanese painters
1752 births
1826 deaths